The following is a list of notable deaths in February 2008.

Entries for each day are listed alphabetically by surname. A typical entry lists information in the following sequence:
 Name, age, country of citizenship at birth, subsequent country of citizenship (if applicable), reason for notability, cause of death (if known), and reference.

February 2008

1
Hélio Quaglia Barbosa, 66, Brazilian member of the Superior Court of Justice, multiple organ failure.
Floyd Boring, 92, American Secret Service agent, helped foil Truman assassination attempt, heart attack.
Beto Carrero, 70, Brazilian theme park owner (Beto Carrero World), endocarditis.
Al DeMao, 87, American football center for the Washington Redskins (1945–1953).
Ralph DiGia, 93, American World War II conscientious objector and peace activist with War Resisters League.
Allan Grant, 88, American photojournalist for Life magazine.
Earl Greenburg, 61, American head of NBC daytime, melanoma.
Frank Fletcher Hamilton, 86, Canadian World War II pilot and politician.
Russi Karanjia, 95, Indian journalist, editor of Blitz.
Władysław Kawula, 70, Polish footballer.
Shell Kepler, 49, American actress (General Hospital), fashion designer (HSC), renal failure.
Tony Silver, 82, American documentary filmmaker known for directing the film Style Wars.
Ralph Wallace, 58, American politician, member of the Texas State House (1977–1992).

2
Gus Arriola, 90, American cartoonist (Gordo), Parkinson's disease. 
Billy Balbastro, 67, Filipino journalist and broadcaster, cancer.
Ahmad Bourghani, 48, Iranian politician, heart failure.
Earl Butz, 98, American politician, Secretary of Agriculture (1971–1976). 
Heinrich Dahlinger, 85, German field handball player, entrepreneur, kidney failure. 
Joshua Lederberg, 82, American Nobel Prize–winning molecular biologist.
Barry Morse, 89, British-born Canadian actor (The Fugitive, Space: 1999).
Katoucha Niane, 47, French supermodel and women's rights activist, drowning.
Sir David Orr, 85, British businessman.
Daoud Soumain, Chadian general, Army Chief of Staff, killed during the Battle of N'Djamena.
Roger Testu, 94, French cartoonist.
Ed Vargo, 79, American baseball umpire. 
Edward Wilson, 60, British actor (When the Boat Comes In), director of the National Youth Theatre, cancer.

3
Cyril Stanley Bamberger, 88, British Royal Air Force pilot.
Samuel Boyle, 59, American bureau chief (New York City) of Associated Press (1981–2002), lung cancer.
Charles Fernley Fawcett, 92, American adventurer, actor and freedom fighter.
Ernesto Illy, 82, Italian food chemist and chairman of the illy coffee company. 
Sigurveig Jónsdóttir, 77, Icelandic actress, natural causes. 
Jorge Liderman, 50, Argentine-American composer, apparent suicide by train impact.
Jackie Orszaczky, 59, Hungarian-born Australian musician, cancer.
Geoffrey Paish, 86, British tennis player and administrator.
John Elliott Smart, 91, British submariner.
Charley van de Weerd, 86, Dutch football player.

4
Chris Anderson, 81, American jazz pianist, complications from a stroke.
Endel Aruja, 96, Estonian physicist.
Sheldon Brown, 63, American bicycle mechanic and technical authority, heart attack.
Larry Cruz, 66, Filipino journalist and restaurateur, pneumonia and complications from cancer.
Augusta Dabney, 89, American actress (The Paper).
Tata Güines, 77, Cuban percussionist, kidney infection.
Rose Hacker, 101, British activist.
Harry Richard Landis, 108, American second-to-last World War I veteran.
Stefan Meller, 65, Polish diplomat, foreign minister (2005–2006). 
Bertha Moss, 88, Argentine actor, cardiac arrest. 
Nikolay Popov, 76, Russian chief designer of T-80 tank, after long illness.
John Snodgrass, 79, British diplomat.
Peter Thomas, Baron Thomas of Gwydir, 87, British Conservative Party chairman (1970–1972), Welsh Secretary (1970–1974).

5
Sayed Nafees al-Hussaini, 74, Pakistani calligrapher.
Zoran Antonijević, 62, Serbian soccer plater.
Schoolboy Cleve, 82, American blues musician, harmonica and guitar player.
Karl Ehrhardt, 83, American New York Mets fan known for his signs in the crowd.
Kenny Konz, 79, American football defensive back (Cleveland Browns), pneumonia.
Maharishi Mahesh Yogi, 90, Indian founder of Transcendental Meditation movement, former guru to The Beatles.
Vitaliy Ponomarenko, 33, Ukrainian powerlifting champion, heart condition.
Winston Walls, 65, American musician, heart failure and diabetes.

6
John Alvin, 59, American movie poster artist (Star Wars, Blade Runner, E.T. the Extra-Terrestrial), heart attack.
Phyllis Barnhart, 85, American animator and cel painter (The Secret of NIMH).
Charles Borck, 91, Filipino Olympic basketball player and coach. 
Nikol Faridani, 72, Iranian aerial photographer, prostate cancer.
Oliver Foot, 61, British President of Orbis International.
John Grimsley, 45, American football linebacker (Houston Oilers, Miami Dolphins), accidental gunshot.
Andrew Harwood, 62, Australian radio and TV presenter (It's Academic, Jeopardy!), actor (The Paul Hogan Show), asthma attack.
Neville Holt, 95, Australian Olympic shooter.
John McWethy, 61, American news correspondent (ABC News), skiing accident.
Kurt Nemetz, 81, Austrian Olympic cyclist.
Ruth Stafford Peale, 101, American writer, widow of Norman Vincent Peale.
Kalpana Rai, 57, Indian actress.
Tony Rolt, 89, British racing driver and last living participant in the first F1 World Championship race.
*Gwenc'hlan Le Scouëzec, 78, French leader of the Druids of Brittany.

7
Richard Altick, 92, American historian and author.
Alberto Bustamante Belaunde, 57, Peruvian politician, Prime Minister (1999–2000), heart attack.
Andrew Bertie, 78, British Grand Master of the Order of Malta.
Hoàng Minh Chính, 85, Vietnamese dissident, pancreatic cancer.
Tamara Desni, 96, German-born British actress.
Lakshmipati, 50, Indian actor.
Helen Mayer, 75, Australian politician, MP (1983–1987).
Benny Neyman, 56, Dutch singer, cancer. 
Daphne Robinson, 75, New Zealand cricketer.
Guy Severin, 81, Russian academician and engineer. 
Kunal Singh, 30, Indian actor, suicide by hanging. 
Frank Wayman, 76, English footballer (Chester City), struck by motorcycle.
Nicolaas Jan van Strien, 61, Dutch conservationist, cancer.
Leona Wood, 86, American painter and dancer

8
John Bartlett, 58, Australian politician.
*Chua Ek Kay, 61, Singaporean painter and Cultural Medallion winner, nose cancer.
Eva Dahlbeck, 87, Swedish actress and writer, infection. 
Frank J. Dixon, 87, American University teacher.
Victor Dominguez, 72, Filipino congressman, cardiac arrest.
Earl B. Fowler Jr., 82, American Vice Admiral.
Robert Jastrow, 82, American astronomer, physicist and cosmologist, pneumonia.
Stephen Kipkorir, 37, Kenyan long-distance runner, car crash.
Swaran Lata, 83, Pakistani film actress.
Jane Lumb, 66, British model and actress, appeared in Fry's Turkish Delight commercials, breast cancer.
Ah Meng, 48, Sumatran orangutan, tourist icon at Singapore Zoo.
K. Rajaram, 82, Indian politician.
Josefina Ríos, 90, Argentinian actress.
Rudie Sypkes, 57, Australian founder of the Chickenfeed retail chain and philanthropist, pulmonary fibrosis.
Phyllis A. Whitney, 104, American mystery novelist (A Place for Ann), pneumonia.

9
Manuel F. Alsina Capo, 98, Spanish-Puerto Rican urologist and surgeon.
Alfred Altenburger, 84, Swiss speed skater.
Baba Amte, 93, Indian social activist, advocate for lepers, RLA recipient.
John Anthony Derrington, 86, British civil engineer.
Robert DoQui, 73, American character actor (RoboCop, Coffy, Nashville).
Scot Halpin, 54, American one time drummer for The Who, brain tumor.
Günter Havenstein, 79, German Olympic runner.
Christopher Hyatt, 64, American psychologist, occultist, and author, cancer.
Dorothy Podber, 75, American performance artist, shot Andy Warhol's Shot Marilyns paintings.
Merril Sandoval, 82, American Navajo Code Talker during World War II.
Joseph Tyree Sneed III, 87, American senior judge (Court of Appeals for the Ninth Circuit).
Carm Lino Spiteri, 75, Maltese architect and politician.
Jazeh Tabatabai, 77, Iranian avant-garde painter, poet, and sculptor, heart failure.
Harry Tapping, 81, New Zealand cricketer.
Guy Tchingoma, 22, Gabonese footballer, on-field collision.
Mindrolling Trichen, 78, Tibetan ceremonial head of the Nyingma school of Tibetan Buddhism.
Georgy Yegorov, 89, Russian Soviet Navy Admiral of the Fleet.

10
John Abbotts, 83, English footballer.
Arne Barhaugen, 76, Norwegian Olympic Nordic combined skier.
Freddie Bell, 76, American rhythm and blues singer, cancer.
Kirk Browning, 86, American television director, heart attack.
Alaa Abdulkareem Fartusi, 29, Iraqi journalist and cameraman, victim of the Balad bomb blast.
Ārijs Geikins, 71, Latvian playwright, writer, director, actor and drama teacher.
Adeline Geo-Karis, 89, American politician, member of Illinois State Senate (1979–2007), natural causes. 
Steve Gerber, 60, American comic book writer, creator of Howard the Duck, idiopathic pulmonary fibrosis.
Ove Jørstad, 37, Norwegian footballer, cardiac arrest.
Ron Leavitt, 60, American co-creator of Married... with Children, lung cancer. 
Dario Lodigiani, 91, American baseball player. 
William Long, 85, British politician, MP of Northern Ireland (1962–1972).
Peter Marginter, 73, Austrian author.
Inga Nielsen, 61, Danish soprano, cancer.
Manuel Ortiz, 59, Cuban Olympic fencer.
Roy Scheider, 75, American actor (Jaws, The French Connection, All That Jazz), staph infection.
Ramón Daumal Serra, 95, Spanish Roman Catholic bishop.
Chris Townson, 60, British drummer (John's Children).
Bengt Westfelt, 84, Swedish Camera department.
Ray Wu, 79, American biologist and educator.

11
Fouad al-Tikerly, 81, Iraqi novelist and judge, pancreatic cancer.
Emilio Carballido, 82, Mexican playwright, heart attack. 
Tom Lantos, 80, American Representative from California since 1981, only Holocaust survivor elected to Congress, esophageal cancer.
Torakichi Nakamura, 92, Japanese professional golfer, natural causes.
Frank Piasecki, 88, American aeronautical engineer who invented the tandem rotor placement in helicopter design, stroke.
Rahatullah, 18, Pakistani cricketer (Peshawar, Under-19 national team), gunshot injury.
Alfredo Reinado, 40, East Timorese rebel, shot during attack on José Ramos-Horta.
Zelig Sharfstein, 79, American chief rabbi of Cincinnati, heart condition.
Melvin Alvah Traylor Jr., 92, American ornithologist and curator emeritus at the Field Museum of Natural History.
Carolina Tronconi, 94, Italian gymnast, Olympic silver medalist (1928).
Laura Urdapilleta, 76, Mexican ballerina

12
Oscar Brodney, 100, American lawyer and screenwriter (Harvey).
John Brunious, 67, American jazz trumpeter, heart attack.
Ron Chippindale, 75, New Zealand chief air accident investigator, car accident.
Wilson Hermosa González, 64, Bolivian musician and composer (Los Kjarkas).
David Groh, 68, American actor (Rhoda), kidney cancer and heart failur.
Thomas Grosser, 42, German footballer, heart attack during training.
Preston Hanson, 87, American actor.
Geoffrey Lewis, 87, British Professor of Turkish at Oxford University.
Monica Morell, 54, Swiss singer, cancer.
Imad Mughniyah, 45, Lebanese senior member of Hezbollah, car bomb.
Badri Patarkatsishvili, 52, Georgian business oligarch and 2008 presidential candidate, heart attack.
Jean Prouff, 88, French footballer and manager.

13
Smoky Dawson, 94, Australian country music performer, after a short illness.
Michele Greco, 83, Italian Mafia boss, lung cancer.
Kon Ichikawa, 92, Japanese film director (Tokyo Olympiad, The Burmese Harp), pneumonia.
Larry King, 15, Student at E.O. Green Junior High School, gunshot by Brandon McInerney
Rajendra Nath, 75, Indian film actor, cardiac arrest.
Henri Salvador, 90, French jazz singer and guitarist, aneurysm.
Lionel Mark Smith, 62, American actor (Edmond, Homicide), cancer.
Roger Voisin, 89, American trumpeter.

14
Gene Allen, 79, American jazz reedist.
Len Boyd, 84, British footballer.
Jess Cain, 81, American radio personality (WHDH AM), cancer. 
Thurlow Cooper, 74, American football player (New York Titans). 
Hal Erickson, 88, American baseball player. 
Werner Giesa, 53, German author.
Chuck Heaton, 90, American sports journalist.
Sir Ralph Howell, 84, British Conservative MP (1970–1997).
Steven Kazmierczak, 27, American mass murderer (Northern Illinois University shooting), suicide by gunshot.
Sir Desmond Langley, 77, British army general.
Perry Lopez, 78, American character actor (Chinatown), lung cancer.
William Modell, 86, American chairman of Modell's Sporting Goods, complications from prostate cancer.
Padoh Mahn Sha Lah Phan, 64, Burmese Secretary General of Karen National Union, gunshot.

15
Ayman al-Fayed, 42, Palestinian commander of al-Quds Brigades, explosion.
Willie P. Bennett, 56, Canadian singer, natural causes.
Sam Bith, 74, Cambodian former Khmer Rouge commander.
Ashley Callie, 34, South African actress, car accident. 
Joaquim Costa, 72, Portuguese rock musician. 
Antoni Heda, 91, Polish Brigadier General, freedom fighter during World War II.
Marcel Hendrickx, 82, Belgian cyclist.
Derek Frank Lawden, 88, British-born New Zealand mathematician.
Amnon Netzer, 73, Iranian Jewish historian. 
Peter B. Neubauer, 94, American child psychiatrist.
Marijan Oblak, 88, Croatian Archbishop of Zadar.
Naziha Salim, 81, Iraqi painter, complications from a stroke.
Walter Warwick Sawyer, 96, English mathematician.
Mikhail Solomentsev, 94, Russian Chairman of the Council of Ministers of the SFSR (1971–1983).
Inge Thun, 62, Norwegian footballer (Strømsgodset), stroke.
Johnny Weaver, 72, American professional wrestler, natural causes.

16
Kenneth Radway Allen, 97, New Zealand fisheries biologist.
Shelley Beattie, 40, American bodybuilder (American Gladiators), suicide.
Hugh Bullard, 65, Bahamian Olympic sprinter.
Harry Flemming, 74, Canadian journalist, complications from cancer and pneumonia. 
Brendan Hughes, 59, Irish member of the Provisional IRA.
Jerry Karl, 66, American racing driver, car accident.
Boris Khmelnitsky, 67, Russian actor in adventure films.
Hans Leussink, 96, German politician.
Shawn Lonsdale, 46, American videographer and critic of Scientology.
Bobby Lord, 74, American country musician. 
Vittorio Lucarelli, 79, Italian Olympic fencer.
Horst-Rüdiger Magnor, 65, German Olympic athlete.
Per Erik Monsen, 61, Norwegian Member of Parliament (1997–2005), complications from heart attack.
James Orange, 65, American civil rights activist.
Fabio Presca, 77, Italian Olympic basketball player.
Charlie Ryan, 92, American musician and songwriter ("Hot Rod Lincoln"), heart disease.

17
Nicola Agnozzi, 96, Italian Roman Catholic prelate.
Aysel Gürel, 80, Turkish lyric writer and actress, chronic bronchitis. 
Brian Harris, 72, English footballer (Everton, Cardiff City, Newport County).
Bill Juzda, 87, Canadian ice hockey defenceman (Toronto Maple Leafs, New York Rangers), cancer.
Manna, 44, Bangladeshi film actor, heart attack.
Val Ross, 57, Canadian journalist and children's writer, brain cancer. 
Benigno G. Tabora, 92, American survivor of Bataan Death March.
Winning Colors, 23, American racehorse, won 1988 Kentucky Derby, euthanized.

18
Grits Gresham, 85, American conservationist, sportsman and actor, complication of infection and pneumonia. 
Jim Jones, 57, American rock guitarist (Pere Ubu), heart attack.
Raymond Kennedy, 73, American novelist, complications of a stroke.
Sir Richard Knowles, 90, British leader of Birmingham City Council (1984–1993), bladder cancer.
Jack Lyons, 92, British financier and philanthropist.
Mihaela Mitrache, 52, Romanian actress, cancer.
Ralph Brazelton Peck, 95, American civil engineer.
Mickey Renaud, 19, Canadian hockey player, hypertrophic cardiomyopathy.
Alain Robbe-Grillet, 85, French writer (Last Year at Marienbad), heart failure.
Raymond J. Smith, 77, American editor, complications of pneumonia.
Stanisław Swatowski, 73, Polish Olympic sprinter.
Alec N. Wildenstein, 67, French international art dealer, ex-husband of socialite Jocelyn Wildenstein, cancer.

19
Barry Barclay, 63, New Zealand film maker, heart attack.
Mary Barclay, 91, British actress.
Jean-Michel Bertrand, 64, French politician.
Natalia Bessmertnova, 66, Russian prima ballerina, cancer.
Samuel Champkin, 28, American singer in Metal band Tech Giants, car crash. 
Richard D'Aeth, 95, British scholar.
Eugene Freedman, 82, American figurine creator. 
Bob Howsam, 89, American sports executive (Denver Broncos, Cincinnati Reds), heart condition.
Yegor Letov, 43, Russian punk rock singer, heart failure.
Teo Macero, 82, American record producer and saxophonist.
Emily Perry, 100, British actress.
Peter Pianto, 78, Australian footballer. 
Lydia Shum, 62, Hong Kong actress, liver cancer. 
David Watkin, 82, British cinematographer (Out of Africa, Chariots of Fire, Moonstruck), Oscar winner (1986), cancer.

20
Peter S. Albin, 73, American economist.
Mary Elizabeth Carnegie, 91, American nurse, cardiovascular disease.
Larry Davis, 41, American convicted murderer, stabbed.
D. G. S. Dhinakaran, 73, Indian evangelist.
Helmut Sturm, 75, German painter. 
Bobby Lee Trammell, 74, American rockabilly singer, Arkansas Representative (1997–2002).
Paranjape Prakash Vishvanath, 60, Indian Shiv Sena politician, cancer.

21
Madalena Barbosa, 65, Portuguese feminist.
Paul-Louis Carrière, 99, French Roman Catholic prelate.
Ben Chapman, 79, American actor (Creature from the Black Lagoon).
Joe Gibbs, 65, Jamaican reggae producer, heart attack.
Ana González Olea, 92, Chilean actress, septic shock.
Archie Hind, 79, British novelist.
Hans Janitschek, 73, Austrian journalist, heart attack.
Geoff Leek, 76, Australian footballer with Essendon.
Sunny Lowry, 97, One of the first English women to swim the English Channel.
Evan Mecham, 83, American Governor of Arizona (1987–1988).
Matthew Mechtel, 39, American candidate for the U.S. House from North Dakota, apparent suicide by gunshot.
Robin Moore, 82, American author (The French Connection, The Green Berets).
Billy J. Murphy, 87, American football coach (University of Memphis).
Emmanuel Sanon, 56, Haitian footballer, pancreatic cancer.
Walter Eric Spear, 87, German physicist. 
Sufi Abu Taleb, 83, Egyptian politician, acting President (1981), Speaker of the People's Assembly (1978–1983).
Sanggyai Yexe, 92, Chinese government official, one of the first ethnic Tibetans to join Mao Zedong's army and embrace Communism.

22
Chuck Adamson, 71, American police officer, cancer.
Richard Baer, 79, American scriptwriter (Bewitched), heart attack.
Johnnie Carr, 97, American civil rights leader.
Eagle Day, 75, American football player, after short illness.
Rubens de Falco, 76, Brazilian telenovela actor (Escrava Isaura), heart failure.
Nunzio Gallo, 79, Italian singer, represented Italy in the 1957 Eurovision Song Contest, brain haemorrhage.
Maurice Laing, 90, English builder.
Dennis Letts, 73, American actor (August: Osage County) and college professor, lung cancer.
Oswaldo Louzada, 95, Brazilian actor, multiple organ dysfunction syndrome.
Stephen Marlowe, 79, American novelist (The Second Longest Night).
Andreas Rüedi, 76, Swiss Olympic skier.
Steve Whitaker, 53, British comic book colorist (V for Vendetta).

23
Joaquim Pinto de Andrade, 81, Angolan politician, first honorary MPLA President, PRD chairman, after long illness.
Henry Arana, 86, Puerto Rican composer.
Janez Drnovšek, 57, Slovenian Prime Minister (1992–2002) and President (2002–2007), cancer.
Josep Palau i Fabre, 90, Spanish author.
Roger Foulon, 84, Belgian writer.
Douglas Fraser, 91, American president of the United Auto Workers, emphysema.
Paul Frère, 91, Belgian Formula One driver, 24 Hours of Le Mans winner and automobile journalist.
Denis Lazure, 82, Canadian politician (NDP), cancer.
Hubert Lilliefors, 79, American statistician, lung cancer.
Gentil Ferreira Viana, 72, Angolan politician.

24
Phil Bodner, 90, American jazz clarinetist and studio musician.
Peter Curtin, 58, Australian cricketer.
Lady Darcy de Knayth, 69, British crossbench member of the House of Lords, disability campaigner.
Alan Dargin, 40, Australian didgeridoo player.
Floyd Matthews, 105, American oldest living submariner.
Larry Norman, 60, American Christian rock singer/songwriter, heart failure.
Shirley Ritts, 87, American interior designer, mother of photographer Herb Ritts, emphysema.
W. Laird Stabler Jr., 77, American former Attorney General of Delaware, oral cancer. 
Pearl Witherington, 93, British World War II Secret Service agent.
Milford Zornes, 100, American watercolor artist, heart failure.

25
Ashley Cooper, 27, Australian V8 Supercar driver, injuries from a race crash.
Genoa Keawe, 89, American performer of Hawaiian music.
Hans Raj Khanna, 95, Indian Supreme Court judge.
Alan Ledesma, 29, Mexican telenovela actor, stomach cancer.
Static Major, 33, American performer, record producer and songwriter, from complications after medical procedure.
Vladimir Troshin, 81, Russian singer and actor.
Roy Wise, American baseball player.

26
Julio García Agapito, 44, Peruvian environmentalist, shot.
Charles Chan, 93, Chinese actor and director.
Jimmy Dugdale, 76, English footballer (West Bromwich Albion, Aston Villa).
Paddy Fahey, 84, Irish Olympic athlete.
Tyronne Fernando, 66, Sri Lankan politician, Foreign Minister (2001–2004).
Cabral Ferreira, 56, Portuguese President of C.F. Os Belenenses (2005–2008), cancer.
Dick Fletcher, 65, American meteorologist at WTSP Tampa Bay, stroke.
Robert Kraichnan, 80, American physicist, heart disease.
Buddy Miles, 60, American drummer (Band of Gypsys, Electric Flag), lead vocalist (California Raisins), heart failure.
Dan Shomron, 70, Israeli general, Chief of the Defense Forces (1987–1991), stroke.
Bodil Udsen, 83, Danish actress, after short illness.
Zbigniew Woźnicki, 49, Polish Olympic cyclist.
John Yates, 82, British Anglican prelate, Bishop of Gloucester (1975–1992).

27
Shihab al-Tamimi, 74, Iraqi head of the Journalists Syndicate, heart attack following shooting.
Mira Alečković, 84, Serbian and Yugoslav poet.
Anna Andreeva, 90, Russian textile designer.
Anthony Blond, 79, British book publisher.
William F. Buckley, Jr., 82, American author, conservative political commentator, founder of National Review magazine, emphysema. 
Boyd Coddington, 63, American owner of hot rod shop, star of American Hot Rod on TLC.
Octavio Cortázar, 73, Cuban film director and screenwriter, heart attack.
Myron Cope, 79, American radio broadcaster for the Pittsburgh Steelers, inventor of the "Terrible Towel".
David Edwards, 20, American football player paralyzed during a game in 2003, pneumonia.
W. C. Heinz, 93, American sportswriter.
Ernst Hiller, 79, German motorcycle racer.
Raymond Kāne, 82, American slack key guitarist.
Mandi Lampi, 19, Finnish child actress and singer. 
Ivan Rebroff, 76, German singer.
Barbara Seaman, 72, American writer, journalist and activist, lung cancer.
Sujatha, 72, Indian author, inventor of the electronic voting machine, multiple organ failure.

28
Aharon Amir, 85, Israeli author and translator, natural causes.
John Bliss, 77, American actor (Ned's Declassified School Survival Guide, Intolerable Cruelty), aortic aneurysm.
Gérard Calvet, 80, French abbot and founder of the Abbey of Le Barroux, heart attack.
Milt Harradence, 86, Canadian lawyer, judge and former leader of PCAA, cancer.
Joseph M. Juran, 103, American engineer and philanthropist, stroke.
Miss Alleged, 20, French Thoroughbred racehorse, euthanized.
Val Plumwood, 67, Australian ecologist and feminist, natural causes.
Philip Rabinowitz, 104, South African fastest centenarian over 100 metres, complications of a stroke.
Julian Rathbone, 73, British novelist.
Mike Smith, 64, British rock and roll singer and keyboardist (The Dave Clark Five), pneumonia.
André Verhalle, 84, Belgian Olympic fencer.

29
Maria Adelaide Aboim Inglez, 75, Portuguese communist activist.
Bill Carlson, 73, American news anchor (WCCO, Twin Cities), prostate cancer.
Buddy Dial, 71, American football player.
Vitaly Fedorchuk, 89, Russian head of the KGB.
Jerry Groom, 78, American football player.
Ralph Hansch, 83, Canadian Olympic ice hockey player.
Janet Kagan, 62, American writer, chronic obstructive pulmonary disease.
Mar Paulos Faraj Rahho, 65, Iraqi Chaldean Catholic archbishop, kidnapped on this date and subsequently found dead.

References

2008-02
 02